Carbia moderescens is a moth in the family Geometridae. It is found on Borneo. The habitat consists of upper montane forests.

The length of the forewings is about 11 mm.

References

Moths described in 1997
Eupitheciini
Moths of Indonesia